"Destroy the Orcs" is the second single by Canadian power metal band 3 Inches of Blood. It was inspired by the work of J. R. R. Tolkien, and is also about revenge. The single was released on October 27, 2003 by Megarock Records. "The Sun Rises Over the Fjords" and "Conquerors of the Northern Sphere" are re-recordings of songs from the band's debut EP, Sect of the White Worm. The cover art was illustrated by Iain McCaig and derives from a gamebook entitled Deathtrap Dungeon, by Ian Livingstone.

Track listing
 "Destroy the Orcs" – 2:15
 "The Sun Rises Over the Fjords" – 3:30 
 "Conquerors of the Northern Sphere" – 2:06

Legacy
"Destroy the Orcs" was re-recorded two years later for inclusion on the band's second studio album, Advance and Vanquish.
Destroy the Orcs is featured in Tim Schafer's game Brütal Legend as one of the tracks in the Deuce's radio, the Mouth of Metal. It is also the theme song for comedian Brian Posehn's podcast, Nerd Poker.

Personnel
 Cam Pipes – clean vocals
 Jamie Hooper – screaming vocals
 Sunny Dhak – lead guitar
 Bobby Froese – rhythm guitar
 Rich Trawick – bass
 Geoff Trawick – drums
 Jesse Gander – producer

2003 singles
3 Inches of Blood songs